Class 150 may refer to:

British Rail Class 150
DB Class ETA 150